Buist is a surname of Scottish origin. It means "homestead." Notable people with the surname include:

Andy Buist (born 1984), English rugby union player
Anne Buist, Australian psychiatrist
George Buist (disambiguation):
George Buist (footballer) (1883–?), English footballer
George Buist (journalist) (1805–1860), Scottish journalist and scientist
George Buist (minister) (1779–1860), Scottish minister of the Church of Scotland
Grant Buist (born 1973), New Zealand cartoonist
Ian Buist (1930-2012), British diplomat
Marguerite Buist (born 1962), New Zealand long-distance runner
Teddy Buist (1885-1959), Australian rules footballer

References

Scottish surnames